Zelenograd may refer to:
Zelenograd, a city in Russia, a part of the federal city of Moscow
Zelenograd (submarine) (K-506), a Russian Delta-class submarine
FC Zelenograd, a Russian soccer club of the Russian Second Division